András Kállay-Saunders (born January 28, 1985), also known as Kállay Saunders, is a Hungarian-American singer, songwriter and record producer. He represented Hungary in the Eurovision Song Contest 2014 in Copenhagen, Denmark with the song "Running".

Early life
András Kállay-Saunders was born in New York City, United States to Hungarian model Katalin Kállay and American soul-singer and producer Fernando Saunders. He is a descendant of the noble Kállay family from his maternal side.

Throughout most of his childhood years Kállay's father was touring the world and playing his music among legends such Luciano Pavarotti, Jeff Beck, Lou Reed and many more but every now and then Fernando would bring along his son to observe. His father would take him to Detroit and show him how it all started; the corners he sang on, places he played. By doing so, Fernando planted the Motown roots deep within Kállay's soul.

In 2010 Kállay decided to visit Hungary to spend time with his grandmother who was ill at the time. During his visit in Hungary, he noticed a TV commercial urging talented singers to audition for the nations talent competition Megasztár.

Career
Kállay ended up finishing fourth in the contest and shortly after signed to Universal and permanently moved to Hungary. Kállay released two singles under Universal, "Csak Veled" "I Love You" both of which became smash hits in Hungary, peaking respectively No. 7 and No. 2 on the Top 40 Hungarian Billboards.

In August 2012 Kállay collaborated with Swedish rapper Rebstar and American producer DJ Pain 1 on Kállays single "Tonight". "Tonight" peaked No. 4 on the Top 40 Hungarian Billboards, making it Kállay's third hit single to reach the top 10 charts.

In November 2012 Kállay announced his departure from Universal and signed a worldwide record deal with Swedish record label Today Is Vintage.

On December 20, 2012 Kállay released his single "My Baby" which also serves as his contribution in the Hungarian "A Dal" Eurovision Song Contest. On February 9 Kállay performed the song in the contest to critical acclaim, garnering 48 out of a maximum of 50 points voted by the jury. Following the performance, My Baby catapulted to #1 on iTunes (Hungary). The music video for My Baby was released on February 8, 2013 and is directed by Los Tiki Pictures. My Baby peaked #1 on the Hungarian iTunes store on March 3, 2013, and charted #1 on the Hungarian Top 40 Radio Charts on April 11, 2013.

Kállay's  debut album titled Delivery Boy was released in 2015 on iTunes.

Kállay represented Hungary in the Eurovision Song Contest 2014 in Copenhagen, Denmark. He came in 5th place with his song "Running".

Since the Eurovision Song Contest 2014, Kállay has gone on to found his own band, Kállay-Saunders Band. He has since then released multiple singles with the band, and collaborated with A Dal 2015 participants, creating acoustic versions of their songs and performing as an interval act in the show. His last album Delivery Boy was one of the 19 records nominated for the IMPALA Album of the Year Award.

He, again, has returned to the 2016 edition of A Dal, this time with his band and vocalist Antonia Vai, performing Who We Are. They made it to be the last four finalists, but didn't win. They were again announced to participate in A Dal 2017 with the song Seventeen. They progressed to the final. In the 2019 edition, he participated again as a member of The Middletonz with Dutch rapper Farshad Alebatool with the song Roses. They made it to the final.

Discography

Singles

See also
 Hungarian pop

References

Sources

External links

 Official website
 András on Facebook (hungarian)

1985 births
Living people
Musicians from New York City
Hungarian pop musicians
American emigrants to Hungary
Andras
Eurovision Song Contest entrants of 2014
American people of Hungarian descent
Eurovision Song Contest entrants for Hungary
Hungarian people of American descent